Jane Brunson Marks (born 1888, died after 1970) was active in civic work.

Early life and family
Jane Brunson was born in Mount Hope, Wisconsin, in 1888, the daughter of Delford Benton Brunson and Effie Fox.

She attended Milwaukee-Downer College and was a member of the Milwaukee-Downer Alumni Club.

Career

Jane Brunson Marks served on the board of the high school Parent-Teacher Association for several years and as Philanthropic Chairman of the Woman's Club of Burbank, located at 703 E. Olive Avenue in Burbank. 

She was the President of Woman's Club of Burbank from 1927 to 1928 and reelected from 1928 to 1929. 

The Burbank Club was incorporated and admitted to state federation in 1917. Its purpose was advancement in all lines of general culture and the promotion of the community welfare. At the 61 years' celebrations, invitations had been extended to past presidents of the club including Jane Marks.

Personal life
Jane Brunson Marks moved to California in 1908 and lived at 1055 Fairmount Road, Burbank, California. 

She married William Philip Marks and had one son: William Philip B., Jr.

References

1888 births
Milwaukee-Downer College alumni
People from Mount Hope, Wisconsin
Year of death missing